Septfontaines is a small town in western Luxembourg. It is part of the commune of Habscht, in the canton of Capellen, which is part of the district of Luxembourg.

Septfontaines Castle is one of the castles belonging to the Valley of the Seven Castles. Located high above the town of Septfontaines, the medieval castle is now privately owned.

Septfontaines was the administrative centre of a commune by the same name until 2018, when it was merged with the commune of Hobscheid to form the commune of Habscht.

Former commune
The former commune consisted of the villages:

 Greisch
 Roodt-sur-Eisch
 Septfontaines
 Simmerfarm
 Simmerschmelz
 Leesbach

Name

The name Septfontaines is a French neologism (the local population is almost entirely Luxembourgish-speaking), derived from the older name Siebenborn (literally, 'seven springs'), which appears as the name of the town in Latin and German documents from the nineteenth century and earlier. This name is also seen in Siewebueren, the name of the town's fountain. The name Siebenborn was often abbreviated 7born in vital records.

References

External links
 
 Commune of Septfontaines official website

 
Towns in Luxembourg
Former communes of Luxembourg